SuperBrawl IV was the fourth SuperBrawl professional wrestling pay-per-view (PPV) event produced by World Championship Wrestling (WCW). The event took place on February 20, 1994 from the Albany Civic Center in Albany, Georgia. This event, along with SuperBrawl Revenge, was one of only two SuperBrawls never released on home video.

The main event was a Thundercage match, in which Ric Flair defeated Big Van Vader to retain the WCW World Heavyweight Championship, with The Boss as special guest referee.

Storylines
The event featured wrestlers from pre-existing scripted feuds and storylines. Wrestlers portrayed villains, heroes, or less distinguishable characters in the scripted events that built tension and culminated in a wrestling match or series of matches.

Event

Jimmy Garvin replaced the injured Michael Hayes in the match against Johnny B. Badd. After the match, Garvin attacked Badd and gave him the 9-1-1.

Results

References

External links
SuperBrawl IV

SuperBrawl 4
Events in Georgia (U.S. state)
1994 in Georgia (U.S. state)
1994 World Championship Wrestling pay-per-view events